Verkhneidrisovo (Ürge İźris) is a rural locality (a village) in Kulchurovsky Selsoviet, Baymaksky District, Bashkortostan, Russia. The population was 412 as of 2010. There are 3 streets.

Geography 
Verkhneidrisovo is located 57 km north of Baymak (the district's administrative centre) by road. Nizhneidrisovo is the nearest rural locality.

References 

Rural localities in Baymaksky District